Normandy Park may refer to:

Normandy Park, New Jersey, residential area in Morris County, New Jersey
Normandy Park Historic District, listed on the NRHP in Morris County, New Jersey
Normandy Park, Washington, city in King County, Washington